Cecilie is a 2007 Danish horror film directed by Hans Fabian Wullenweber.

In 2008, the film has been nominated for the Robert Awards and Sonja Richter was nominated for the Bodil Prize for Best Actress.

Cast 
 Sonja Richter - Cecilie Larsen
 Anders W. Berthelsen - Per Hartmann
  - Mads Larsen
  - Karsten Levinsen
 Lars Mikkelsen - Lasse N. Damgaard
 Morten Suurballe - Peter Thomassen
  - Michael Konnerup
  - Camilla Simonsen
  - Louise, Lærer
 Thomas W. Gabrielsson - Peter, Genbo
 Mille Dinesen - Mette, Genbo

References

External links 

2007 horror films
2007 films
Danish horror films
2000s Danish-language films